Moogfest is a music and technology festival held annually or bi-annually in Durham, North Carolina that honors engineer Robert Moog and his musical inventions.

This multi-day, multi-venue event hosts artists and audiences from throughout the world.  The performing artists are not only those who use Moog instruments for their own works, but also those who create musical experiences that embody the essence of Bob Moog's visionary and creative spirit.  The festival also offers interactive experiences, visual art exhibitions, installations, film screenings, panel discussions, question and answer sessions, and workshops.

Festival history

Background and origins

Robert Moog, born on May 23, 1934, in New York City and died on August 21, 2005, in Asheville, North Carolina, developed his first commercial voltage-controlled analog synthesizer with American composer, inventor, and educator Herbert Deutsch in 1964.  At the time, other synthesizers were already on the market, but Moog synthesizer began to gain wider attention in the music industry after it was demonstrated at the Monterey International Pop Festival in 1967.  The Beatles, Mick Jagger and Sun Ra were among the first customers, but the commercial breakthrough of a Moog recording was made by Wendy Carlos in the 1968 record Switched-On Bach, which became one of the highest-selling classical music recordings of its era.  Keith Emerson first discovered the Moog when he heard Switched-On Bach, and one year later in 1970, he wanted to take it on the road with him.  Robert Moog replied that there was no chance because the machine was too fragile and required extensive training to operate properly, but Emerson finally convinced Moog and the Minimoog was released.

Keith Emerson was the first musician to tour with a Minimoog during Emerson, Lake & Palmer's Pictures at an Exhibition shows.  The Minimoog became the most popular monophonic synthesizer of the 1970s, and it was quickly taken up by leading rock and electronic music groups such as Yes, Tangerine Dream, Parliament-Funkadelic, Pink Floyd, Devo, Yellow Magic Orchestra, Gary Numan, and Rush, and musicians such as Pete Townshend, George Harrison, Ray Manzarek, Stevie Wonder, Joe Zawinul, Chick Corea, Isao Tomita, and Herbie Hancock.  In 1974 the German electronic group Kraftwerk further popularized the sound of the synthesizer with their landmark album Autobahn, which used several types of synthesizer including a Minimoog.  Italian producer and composer Giorgio Moroder helped to shape the development of disco music.  The Minimoog was highly popular in the 1970s and 1980s, and has been used by many artists.  The Moog also became synonymous with funk and West Coast hip hop, techno, sci-fi sounds, and the instrument figured in the most classic of classic rock albums such as Abbey Road and Who's Next.

David Borden, former director of the Cornell University Digital Music Program, who worked alongside Robert Moog in his Trumansburg studios and later founded the first live synthesizer ensemble, Mother Mallard's Portable Masterpiece Company, in 2000 performed at the Smithsonian Institution in Washington, D.C. with his Mother Mallard and Keith Emerson, in an event honoring Moog called The Keyboard Meets Modern Technology.  This event, somehow, came just four years before the first Moogfest was held in New York City.

The New York years (2004–2008)

Moog Music, David Olivier, Moog Music's New York area representative, contacted Charles Carlini, a New York-based music and concert promoter, about producing an event to celebrate the 50th anniversary of the company and its involvement in electronic music.  The first event, presented by Clinic Crafters Workshop and Sam Ash Music, entitled Manny's Music Presents MoogFest!: A Free Moog Clinic Featuring Keith Emerson and Bob Moog, was held at Manny's Music store on May 17, 2004, just one day before the official date for the Festival.  The first Moogfest was held at B.B. King Blues Club & Grill in Times Square on Tuesday, May 18.  Randy Fuchs, the artist relations director for Moog, contacted Keith Emerson, Rick Wakeman, Jordan Rudess, Bernie Worrell and other well-known Moog users and put them in touch with Charles Carlini. It was a sold-out, one-night, one-time, four-hour gala that saw Keith Emerson, Rick Wakeman of Yes on the day of his birthday, Bernie Worrell of Parliament-Funkadelic, and jazz fusion guitarist Stanley Jordan among those who played in front of an audience of around 600.  The Moogfest 2005 at B.B. King's on May 31, was a great success and saw the participation of Edgar Winter, Will Calhoun of Living Colour, Brazilian Girls, Jordan Rudess of Dream Theater, Frank Zappa's keyboardist Don Preston, Miles Davis' keyboardist Adam Holzman, Money Mark of the Beastie Boys, Steve Molitz of Particle and DJ Logic, but not Bob Moog, who was sick and died from brain cancer on August 21, 2005.

Carlini continued to cultivate Moogfest as a tribute to Bob Moog.  He said that "[m]y vision was to work with musicians who defined the instrument and had a very tight relationship with Bob; most were actual friends who would call him on the phone. I wanted to keep it pure."  The Moogfest 2006 at B.B. King on Thursday, June 22, saw Keith Emerson returning to headline, together with Jan Hammer, Roger O'Donnell of The Cure, Jordan Rudess of Dream Theater, The Mahavishnu Project with Miles Davis' keyboardist Adam Holzman, The School of Rock, and DJ Logic.  Part of the event was filmed and then released in DVD format by MVD in June 2007.  Keith Emerson and Jan Hammer were the recipients of the first ever Bob Moog Legacy Award.  Mike Adams, president of Moog Music announced the inception of the award and called on the stage Roger O'Donnell and Jordan Rudess to present them.  On the evening of Thursday September 20, 2007, Moogfest, in conjunction with the Bob Moog Foundation, presented the first annual Moogfest Symposium.  Herbert Deutsch, Gershon Kingsley, Joel Chadabe, John Eaton, David Borden, and Trevor Pinch attended the symposium arranged by Bob's daughter Michelle at the Music Department of the Columbia University, an afternoon of lectures and talks to discuss how the Moog synthesizer has affected their own work.  The Moogfest 2007, once again at B.B. King on Saturday, September 22, included Thomas Dolby, after a 15-year hiatus from the music business, Jordan Rudess of Dream Theater, Miles Davis' keyboardist Adam Holzman, Spiraling, Frank Zappa's keyboardist Don Preston, Gershon Kingsley, Herbert Deutsch, and Erik Norlander, among others. Thereminist Shueh-li Ong with Xenovibes; reportedly the second thereminist who has performed at a Moogfest so far, opened. Herbert Deutsch and Gershon Kingsley were the recipients of the Bob Moog Legacy Award for their unique, lasting artistry as expressed through Moog instruments.  This was the last time that B.B. King held the festival.

The fifth edition of Moogfest in 2008 brought a change of venues, from the B.B King to the more expansive Hammerstein Ballroom in Manhattan Center.  Carlini explained this shift: "Mike Adams wanted to see a younger generation learn about Moog and pushed for jam band Umphrey's McGee as headliner."  The show was set for October 13, the second Monday of October, an official holiday celebrated as Columbus Day, but also a date that turned out to be right after the financial institution crisis hit its peak and several major institutions such as Lehman Brothers, Merrill Lynch, Fannie Mae, Freddie Mac, Washington Mutual, Wachovia, and AIG either failed, were acquired under duress, or were subject to government takeover under the Bush administration.  The event, featuring Umphrey's McGee, Eric McFadden Trio, Bernie Worrell of P-Funk, Aron Magner of Disco Biscuits, Jamie Shields of The New Deal, Joe Russo and others, had a very poor turnout and Carlini relinquished the Moogfest name to Moog Music.  Bernie Worrell was the recipient of the Bob Moog Legacy Award for his groundbreaking use of the synthesizer in the areas of funk, rhythm and blues, and rock and roll.

This was the last time that Moogfest was held in New York City and there was no Moogfest in 2009.

Moogfest in Asheville (2010–2012)

In 2010, Moog Music partnered with AC Entertainment, a music promotion company that co-produces the Bonnaroo Music & Arts Festival, moved Moogfest from New York City to Asheville in North Carolina, and expanded it from a one evening event to a three-day, multi-venue festival during the last weekend of October.  The sixth Moogfest, but first in Asheville, took place in five stages at places in downtown Asheville that ranged from clubs to arenas, and drew 7,000 to 7,500 people a day.  The festival, from Friday October 29 through to Sunday October 31, 2010, featured more than 60 acts that ranged from rock to hip-hop to electronica, including Massive Attack, Sleigh Bells, Caribou, MGMT, Thievery Corporation, Hot Chip, Disco Biscuits, Big Boi, El-P, Four Tet, Pretty Lights, Bonobo, Jon Hopkins, and Dan Deacon.  Devo were the recipient of the Moog Innovator Award, but the band could not perform, because its guitarist, Bob Mothersbaugh, injured his hand. Though Moog instruments, such as the Voyager, Moogerfooger, Etherwave Theremin, and Little Phatty were highly used by the performers participating in the event, the bands requested to play were not chosen by their involvement with Moog, but rather by their overall creativity and likeliness to Bob Moog's creative entity.

The seventh edition, second for both Asheville and AC Entertainment, of the Moogfest was held on October 28–30, 2011, on Halloween weekend with a line-up of popular artists from varied genres, including The Flaming Lips, Terry and Gyan Riley, Moby, Passion Pit, Sound Tribe Sector 9, Tangerine Dream, and TV on the Radio.  The 2011 festival also featured "SYNTH: A Group Art Show Inspired by Bob Moog", which is a showcase of handmade limited-edition screen prints by some of the top concert poster artists and graphic designers working today, and 77 Million Paintings, an art exhibit and talk by electronic music pioneer Brian Eno, and moreover panel discussions, question and answer sessions, art exhibitions and installations, film screenings, and workshops.  Minimalist composer, Terry Riley, performed a set lasting for almost two straight hours.  In 2011, Moogfest updated its festival technologies by releasing a Moogfest iPhone app. The app contained a festival map and schedule, and also sent users real-time updates about festival news and unannounced secret shows.

After the festival weekend, Asheville's local newspaper released that over 30 arrests were made during Moogfest 2011. Most of these were drug- or alcohol-related charges.

The 2012 Moogfest featured Primus's 3D Tour, Orbital, Miike Snow, Santigold, Richie Hawtin, Squarepusher, Explosions in the Sky, The Magnetic Fields, Four Tet, Divine Fits, GZA performing Liquid Swords, Carl Craig, Pantha Du Prince, Shpongle, Thomas Dolby, Black Moth Super Rainbow, Actress, Cold Cave, El-P, Prefuse 73, Bear in Heaven, Killer Mike, Blondes, Julia Holter, Disclosure, Exit Music, Trust, Death Grips, and Wick-it the Instigator.

Moogfest in Asheville (2013-2014)
After the 2012 Moogfest it was announced that AC Entertainment was not renewed and for 2013 the corresponding event was called the "Mountain Oasis Electronic Music Summit". There was no "Moogfest" in 2013. In 2013 it was announced that there would be a Moogfest in 2014.

Moogfest 2014 took place in Asheville over five days, from Wednesday, April 23 to Sunday, April 27. It featured performances from Kraftwerk, Pet Shop Boys, M.I.A, Giorgio Moroder, CHIC featuring Nile Rodgers, Flying Lotus, Keith Emerson, Dillon Francis, El-P, YACHT, RJD2, Riff Raff, Avey Tare's Slasher Flicks, Just Blaze, Holly Herndon, Chris Clark, Machinedrum, Le1f, Bottin, Metro Area, Com Truise, Dan Deacon, Saul Williams, Zeds Dead, TOKiMONSTA, The Gaslamp Killer, Green Velvet, Moderat, Shigeto, Factory Floor, Wolf Eyes, Tiga, Teengirl Fantasy, and many more.

Moogfest in Durham (2016)
There was no Moogfest in 2015, as the organizers considered it a biennial event. For 2016, the festival was moved from Asheville to Durham. Festival organizers took the opportunity to publicly denounce the controversial North Carolina Public Facilities Privacy & Security Act, commonly referred to as "House Bill 2". In response, the festival partnered with activist groups for a campaign called "Synthesize Love", raising funds to fight HB2 through T-shirt sales. They also held an anti-HB2 forum and "Open Mic," and provided gender-neutral bathrooms at most venues.

The festival's 2016 headliners were ODESZA, Grimes, Miike Snow, Gary Numan (3 night residency), GZA (2 night residency), Laurie Anderson, Explosions in the Sky, Blood Orange, sunn O))), Oneohtrix Point Never, The Orb, and keynote speakers Dr. Martine Rothblatt and Jaron Lanier. Other performers and presenters at the festival included Reggie Watts, Silver Apples, Actress, Tim Hecker, Ben Frost, Suzanne Ciani, YACHT, Robert Hood, Hundred Waters, HEALTH, Daniel Lanois, Son Lux, Julia Holter, Ryan Hemsworth, The Body, Floating Points, The Range, Empress Of, DJ Lance Rock with Yo Gabba Gabba!, Disasterpeace, Laurel Halo, Lunice, Kode9, Tyondai Braxton, Janelle Monáe, and more.

However, the festival and parent company Moog Music Inc. has been the subject of several lawsuits, for complaints including breach of contract, non-payment, and fraud, including a 2019 lawsuit filed by Q Level LLC and another lawsuit filed in 2021 by Moogfest LLC and UG Strategies LLC, as well as a 2020 sexual discrimination lawsuit filed by former employee Hannah Green.</ref></ref>: https://pitchfork.com/news/moog-facing-lawsuits-over-discrimination-contract-breaches/

Locations

New York (2004–2008)
New York City was the home of the festival for its first five editions, from 2004 to 2008.

Manny's Music
Manny's Music was a music store that opened in 1935, located on 156 West 48th Street, between 6th and 7th Avenues near Times Square in Manhattan.  Manny's Music saw the very first event, entitled Manny's Music Presents MoogFest!: A Free Moog Clinic Featuring Keith Emerson and Bob Moog, that was held at Manny's Music store on May 17, 2004, one day before the official date of the first Moogfest.

B.B. King Blues Club & Grill
The B.B. King Blues Club & Grill is a live music venue located in the heart of Times Square, on 237 42nd Street.  The first Moogfest as well as the second edition of 2005, the third edition of 2006, and the fourth edition of 2007 were all held at the B.B. King.

Hammerstein Ballroom
The Hammerstein Ballroom, located within the Manhattan Center Studios on 311 West 34th Street in Manhattan, is a two-tiered,  ballroom known for its elegant appearance and excellent acoustical design.  The ballroom seats 2,500 people for theatrical productions and musical performances, the two main balconies seat a total of 1,200, and the floor slants down to the stage area to enable those in the back rows to see easily.  The Hammerstein Ballroom was home of the fifth edition of Moogfest in 2008.

Asheville (2010–2014)
The Moogfest's primary venues are all located on the north side of Asheville's downtown.

Asheville Civic Center
The Asheville Civic Center, located at number 87 of Haywood Street, houses both the 6,000-capacity Asheville Civic Center Arena, and the smaller 2,400-seat Thomas Wolfe Auditorium.

Animoog Playground
The Animoog Playground is an all ages outdoor, open air space filled with interactive art installations located in the heart of downtown Asheville at the Renaissance Asheville Hotel at number 31 of Woodfin Street.  The Animoog Playground since the 2011 edition of the festival hosts performances beginning in the late afternoon of each day and continuing into the evening. The Animoog playground hosted some of the largest events at the 2011 Moogfest, such as performances by Chromeo, Crystal Castles, The Flaming Lips, and Passion Pit.

The Orange Peel
The Orange Peel, located at number 101 of Biltmore Avenue, is a 1,100-capacity club named by Rolling Stone magazine as one of the best rock clubs in the country.  The Orange Peel also holds a Minimoogseum: A History of the Minimoog and a Playable Theremin.

Diana Wortham Theatre
The Diana Wortham Theatre is a 500-seat venue located at number 2 of South Pack Square that hosts live exhibitions.

Moogaplex
The Moogaplex, located at the Haywood Park Hotel complex at number 1 of Battery Park Avenue, is an all ages venue that hosts the Moog Workshops & Panels with a capacity of 250 people, and the Synth Art Show and DJ's sets with a capacity of 400 people.

Asheville Music Hall
The Asheville Music Hall is an 18+ venue with a capacity of 400 people located at number 31 of Patton Avenue and hosts live events. The Asheville Music Hall had previously been known as Stella Blue, but the name was changed just prior to the 2011 festival.  In the 2010 edition of the festival, Stella Blue hosted some national and regional emerging acts.  In 2011, Stella Blue was renamed as the Asheville Music Hall, though it served the same purpose as it did the year before.

Fine Arts Theater
The Fine Arts Theater is a 250-seat movie theater located at number 36 of Biltmore Avenue.  It is the place where Moogfest screens films related to Moog such as Moog, the 2004 documentary film by Hans Fjellestad about electronic instruments pioneer Robert Moog. In 2011, the only event the Fine Arts Theater venue was used for was Tara Busch's Live Film Scoring on the last day of the festival.

YMI Cultural Center
The YMI Cultural Center is located at number 39 of S Market Street # B and hosts small live events. In 2011, Brian Eno's 77 Million Paintings installation was displayed at the YMI Cultural center. It started Moogfest weekend, but then became open to the public and continued to run from November 2 through November 30.

Moog Music factory
The Moog Music factory is located at number 160 of Broadway Street and holds some events as part of the festival. In addition to their own on-stage performances at the 2011 Moogfest, Alan Palomo of Neon Indian, and Dan Deacon held a live in-store collaboration performed on Moog instruments. The Moog Music Factory also doubles as a shop selling Moog products such as Mooger Foogers, Moog Voyagers, Moog Theremins.

Lineups

2004
The first Moogfest was a sold-out four-hour gala held at the B.B. King Blues Club & Grill in Times Square, Manhattan on Tuesday, May 18.

2005
The second Moogfest was a great success that was held at the B.B. King Blues Club & Grill in Times Square, Manhattan on Tuesday, May 31.

2006
The third Moogfest was held at B.B. King on Thursday, June 22.  It was filmed and published in a documentary entitled, Moogfest 2006: Live.

2007
The fourth edition of Moogfest was held at B.B. King on Saturday, September 22.  This was the last time that B.B. King held the festival.

2008
The fifth edition of Moogfest was held at the Hammerstein Ballroom in Manhattan Center on Monday, October 13.  The event had a very poor turnout, and this was the last time that Moogfest was held in New York City and there was no Moogfest in 2009.

2010
The sixth edition of Moogfest was the first held in Asheville, and it was expanded to a three-day, multi-venue festival.  It took place in five stages at places in downtown Asheville.  The 2010 edition attracted 7,000 to 7,500 people a day.  Devo were scheduled for Friday night at the Thomas Wolfe Auditorium, but the band could not perform because its guitarist, Bob Mothersbaugh, was injured.  2010 was the first year the festival hosted films, panels, discussions, and workshops.

2011
The seventh edition of Moogfest was held on Halloween weekend.  Brian Eno played a major role at Moogfest 2011, with his 77 Million Paintings exhibit and Illustrated Talk being the two most talked about events at the festival.  Those who attended Eno's talk claimed that the discussion was "unexpectedly funny".  Though still listed on the lineup, neither Glasser nor Little Dragon nor Yacht were able to perform at the 2011 festival, due to traveling issues.

{| class="wikitable" style="width:100%; font-size:88%"
! Moogfest 2011 lineup
|-
|

|-
|

|-
|

|-
|

|-
|
{| class="collapsible collapsed" style="width:100%; text-align:center"
! colspan=2  | Diana Wortham Theatre
|- style="vertical-align:top"
| style="width:50%; font-weight:bold" |Friday, October 28
Saturday, October 29
|- style="vertical-align:top"
|Lunzproject featuring Hans-Joachim Roedelius and Tim StoryMimi Goese and Ben NeillCausing a TigerShahzad Ismaily
|Adrian Belew Power TrioStickmenWham City Comedy TourHans-Joachim Roedelius
|}
|-
|

|-
|

|-
|

|-
|

|}

2012

2014
Moogfest 2014 was expanded to five days, and was held in Asheville from Wednesday, April 23 to Sunday, April 27.

2016

The 2016 iteration of the festival moved locations, from Asheville to Durham, NC. Festival organizers used this event to not only create safe spaces for trans and gender-nonconforming festival attendees and to educate about the dangers of House Bill 2. For the first time in 11 years, the festival was held on the weekend closest to Bob Moog's birthday, from May 19 to 22. Headliners included Grimes, Gary Numan, GZA, Laurie Anderson, Explosions in the Sky, Blood Orange, sunn O))), and Oneohtrix Point Never, with keynote speakers Dr. Martine Rothblatt and Jaron Lanier.

2017
The 2017 edition of the festival was held May 18 to 21. The performance lineup was announced March 7 and included Flying Lotus, Animal Collective, Suzanne Ciani, Derrick May, Gotye (performing a tribute to the late Jean-Jacques Perrey), Talib Kweli, 808 State, Jessy Lanza, Simian Mobile Disco, Moor Mother, Syrinx, Visible Cloaks, Mykki Blanco, Princess Nokia, Omar Souleyman, S U R V I V E (who performed a live rendition of their score to the series Stranger Things), and many more. Many of the performers also participated in daytime programming, such as workshops and discussions.

2018
Moogfest 2018 was held on May 17 to 20 in Durham, North Carolina. The lineup stressed "female, non-binary, and transgender artists", and included an appearance by Chelsea Manning. This generated some controversy, with Caroline Polachek choosing to pull out of the lineup.

Engineering Workshop
Beginning in 2014, Engineer VIP Pass holders participated in Engineering Workshops (also advertised as Synth-Building Workshops). Participants received a kit for an unreleased Moog product and constructed it under the guidance of Moog engineers over the course of the festival. Some of these products went on to retail release, while others remain Moogfest exclusives.

Workshop Kits
 Moog Werkstatt-Ø1 (2014)
 Moog BFAM (Brother From Another Mother) (2016)
 Moog DFAM (Drummer From Another Mother) (2017)
 Moog Subharmonicon (2018)
 Moog Spectravox (2019)

Moog Innovation Award
The Moog Innovation Award, introduced since the third edition of the festival in 2006, celebrates "pioneering artists whose genre-defying work exemplifies the bold, innovative spirit of Bob Moog".

See also

Robert Moog
Bob Moog Foundation
Moog Music
Moog synthesizer
Minimoog
Moog
List of electronic music festivals

Notes

References
Books

Films and documentaries

News, magazines, journals and papers

Web resources

External links

Festivals in North Carolina
Music festivals established in 2004
Events in Asheville, North Carolina
Festivals in Manhattan
Music of New York (state)
Music of North Carolina
Tourist attractions in Asheville, North Carolina
Electronic music festivals in the United States
2004 establishments in North Carolina